Ajmal Faisal (born August 14, 1990, Kabul) is an Afghan boxer. Faisal competed at the 2012 Summer Olympics, representing Afghanistan in the Men's Flyweight. He was defeated in the Round of 32 by France's Nordine Oubaali 22–9.

References

1990 births
Living people
Olympic boxers of Afghanistan
Flyweight boxers
Afghan male boxers
Boxers at the 2012 Summer Olympics

People from Kabul